The Professorships of Astrophysics are a number of professorships in astronomy at the University of Cambridge. The oldest and only permanently-established chair was founded in 1909, and is currently held at the Institute of Astronomy.

The creation of the 1909 professorship in Cambridge marked the formal recognition of the relatively new subject of Astrophysics.  It was without a stipend until 1928, when the first holder Hugh Newall endowed it on his retirement.

In addition to the permanent chair, the university has established five other Professorships of Astrophysics for single tenures (i.e. as personal chairs).

Professors of Astrophysics (1909)
 Hugh Newall  (1909–1928)
 F.J.M. Stratton  (1928–1947)
 R.O. Redman (1947–1971)
 Donald Lynden-Bell (1971–1997)
 George Efstathiou (1997–2022)
 Hiranya Peiris (2023-)

Professors of Astrophysics (single-tenure establishments)
 Donald Lynden-Bell (1997–2001) – at the Institute of Astronomy
 Neil Wyn Evans (2009–) – at the Institute of Astronomy
 Mike Hobson (2011–) – at the Department of Physics
 Mark Wyatt (2016–) – at the Institute of Astronomy
 Mike Irwin (2018–) – at the Institute of Astronomy

References 

 
Astrophysics, *
Faculty of Physics and Chemistry, University of Cambridge
Physics education in the United Kingdom
1909 establishments in England
Astrophysics, *, Cambridge